Kreidersville Covered Bridge, built in 1839, is the last remaining covered bridge in Northampton County, Pennsylvania.

In 1959, inspired citizens of Northampton County rallied for its preservation after it became known that the State Highway Department had plans to build a new concrete bridge in its place. Kreidersville Covered Bridge became one of the first covered bridges to be recognized for preservation by a committee of enthusiasts. In 1959, they formed a state organization called The Theodore Burr Covered Bridge Society of Pennsylvania. The society was named for the arched truss patented by Theodore Burr and used in the construction of the bridge.

In 1960, The Burr Covered Bridge Society, together with The Harmony Grange and local citizens, influenced Northampton County Commissioners to accept ownership after the Pennsylvania State Highway Department restored the bridge. Kreidersville Covered Bridge crosses the Hokendauqua Creek. Its length is 116 feet. On September 30, 1961, state, county, and local representatives took part in rededicating the bridge, then known as Solt's Bridge. Kreidersville Covered Bridge was once known in the community as "Hummel's - Koch's - Solt's Bridge." They were names of families who lived near the bridge at the time.

Kreidersville Covered Bridge is a Burr truss wooden covered bridge. It is the last stop on the Lehigh Valley Covered Bridge tour through Northampton and Lehigh counties. There are seven covered bridges to visit and it is approximately 50 miles on the tour.

The bridge was added to the National Register of Historic Places in 1980.

References

External links
 Kreidersville Covered Bridge
 Kreidersville Covered Bridge via blipfoto

Covered bridges on the National Register of Historic Places in Pennsylvania
Covered bridges in Northampton County, Pennsylvania
Bridges completed in 1840
Wooden bridges in Pennsylvania
Bridges in Northampton County, Pennsylvania
Tourist attractions in Northampton County, Pennsylvania
National Register of Historic Places in Northampton County, Pennsylvania
Road bridges on the National Register of Historic Places in Pennsylvania
Burr Truss bridges in the United States